Henry Meysey Meysey-Thompson, 1st Baron Knaresborough (30 August 1845 – 3 March 1929) was a Liberal (and later Liberal Unionist) politician who sat in the House of Commons variously between 1880 and 1905 when he was raised to the peerage as Baron Knaresborough.

Early life
Meysey-Thompson was born at Kirby Hall, near Great Ouseburn, North Yorkshire, the son of Sir Harry Meysey-Thompson, 1st Baronet and his wife Elizabeth Anne Croft, daughter of Sir John Croft, 1st Baronet. His brothers, Albert and Charles won the FA Cup with the Wanderers in 1872 and 1873 respectively.

He was educated at Eton College and at Trinity College, Cambridge where he won his blue in athletics and was awarded BA in 1868.

Career

He became a private secretary to William Ewart Gladstone. In 1874, he succeeded to the Meysey-Thompson baronetcy which had been created for his father less than two months earlier. He was a J.P. for the North and West Ridings of Yorkshire, and captain in the Yorkshire Hussars Yeoman Cavalry.

At the 1880 general election Meysey-Thompson was elected Liberal Member of Parliament (MP) for Knaresborough, but his election was declared void on 23 July 1880. In 1885 he stood for parliament unsuccessfully at North Lincolnshire. At the 1885 general election he was elected MP for Brigg. However, in 1886, as one of the MPs who opposed Gladstone's Irish Home Rule Bill, he joined the breakaway Liberal Unionist Party, but was not re-elected.

Meysey-Thompson was elected MP for Handsworth (on the outskirts of Birmingham), at the 1892 general election and held that seat until he was ennobled on 26 December 1905 as Baron Knaresborough, of Kirkby Hall in the County of York. 

Lord Knaresborough was chairman of the North Eastern Railway from 1912 to 1922.

Personal life

On 21 April 1885, Meysey-Thompson married Ethel Adeline Pottinger (1864–1922), a daughter of Sir Henry Pottinger, 3rd Baronet. Around 1901, his wife was painted by the American portraitist John Singer Sargent. Henry and Ethel were the parents of one son and four daughters, including:

 Violet Ethel Meysey-Thompson (1886–1960), who married Alexander Moore Vandeleur. After his death, she married Sir Algar Howard.
 Claude Henry Meysey-Thompson (1887–1915), who died during World War I at Ypres from wounds received in action. 
 Helen Winifred Meysey-Thompson (1889–1958), who married Richard Legh, 3rd Baron Newton (1888–1960).
 Doris Mary Pottinger Meysey-Thompson (1899–1953), who married Captain Francis Egerton, grandson of Royal Navy Admiral Francis Egerton
 Gwendolen Carlis Meysey-Thompson (1903–1989), who married Lt.-Col. Sir Charles Richmond Brown, 4th Baronet (1902–1995) in 1951. They divorced in 1968.

He died in London at the age of 83. The peerage became extinct on the death of Lord Knaresborough in 1929, but the baronetcy passed to a nephew, Algar de Clifford Charles Meysey-Thompson.

Descendants
Through his daughter Helen he was a grandfather of Peter Richard Legh, 4th Baron Newton, and through his daughter Violet, he was a grandfather of the distinguished soldier Giles Vandeleur.

References

External links 

 

1845 births
People educated at Eton College
Knaresborough
Liberal Party (UK) MPs for English constituencies
UK MPs 1880–1885
UK MPs 1885–1886
UK MPs 1892–1895
UK MPs 1895–1900
UK MPs 1900–1906
UK MPs who were granted peerages
1929 deaths
North Eastern Railway (UK) people
Liberal Unionist Party MPs for English constituencies
Liberal Unionist Party peers
Peers created by Edward VII
English justices of the peace